The 2013 FSP Gold River Women's Challenger was a professional tennis tournament played on outdoor hard courts. It was the second edition of the tournament which was part of the 2013 ITF Women's Circuit, offering a total of $50,000 in prize money. It took place in Sacramento, United States, on July 1–7, 2013.

WTA entrants

Seeds 

 1 Rankings as of June 24, 2013

Other entrants 
The following players received wildcards into the singles main draw:
  Lauren Embree
  Brianna Morgan
  Maria Sanchez

The following players received entry from the qualifying draw:
  Robin Anderson
  Alisa Kleybanova
  Jessica Lawrence
  Mary Weatherholt

The following player received entry from a Protected Ranking:
  Ivana Lisjak

Champions

Women's singles 

  Mayo Hibi def.  Madison Brengle 7–5, 6–0

Women's doubles 

  Naomi Broady /  Storm Sanders def.  Robin Anderson /  Lauren Embree 6–3, 6–4

External links 
 
 2013 FSP Gold River Women's Challenger at ITFtennis.com

2013 ITF Women's Circuit
2013 in American tennis
2013 in sports in California
FSP Gold River Women's Challenger